Emmanuel Episcopal Church Complex is a historic Episcopal church complex located at 37 W. Main Street in Norwich, Chenango County, New York.  The complex consists of the church, parish hall, and education building. The church was designed by architect Isaac G. Perry and built in 1874 in the Gothic Revival style.  It is a one-story, rectangular limestone structure, 116 feet long and 62 feet wide.  The main facade features two square, engaged towers of uneven heights.  The parish hall was built in 1915 and expanded with the education building.

It was added to the National Register of Historic Places in 2009.

References

External links
Emmanuel Episcopal Church website

Episcopal church buildings in New York (state)
Churches on the National Register of Historic Places in New York (state)
Churches completed in 1874
Churches in Chenango County, New York
19th-century Episcopal church buildings
National Register of Historic Places in Chenango County, New York